John Iliffe (born 1 May 1939) is a British historian, specialising in the history of Africa and especially Tanzania. He was Professor of African History at the University of Cambridge and fellow of St John's College, Cambridge. He was awarded the 1988 Herskovits Prize for The African Poor: A History.

Iliffe was a fellow of the British Academy from 1989 to 2006.

Notable works 
 Africans : The History of a Continent
 Cattle Rancher
 The African Poor : A History
 East African Doctors: A History of the Modern Profession
 A Modern History of Tanganyika
 Honour in African history
 Famine in Zimbabwe, 1890-1960
 The Emergence of African Capitalism
 Obasanjo, Nigeria and the World
 The African AIDS Epidemic: A History

External links 
 Page at St John's College, Cambridge
 Biography by the Society of Old Framlinghamians

1939 births
Living people
Historians of Africa
British historians
British Africanists
Fellows of St John's College, Cambridge
Academic staff of the University of Dar es Salaam
Historians of Zimbabwe
Historians of Tanzania
Historians of Nigeria
Professors of the University of Cambridge
Fellows of the British Academy